Aimar-Charles-Marie Nicolaï (14 August 1747, Paris – 7 July 1794, Paris) was a French magistrate in the Ancien Régime of France. He was the first president of the Chambre des Comptes, and the seventh member elected to occupy seat 2 of the Académie française in 1788.

After giving praise to Louis XVI of France during his reception at the Academy, he was declared an enemy of the people and sentenced to death by guillotine in 1794.

1747 births
1794 deaths
Writers from Paris
Economic history of the Ancien Régime
Members of the Académie Française
French people executed by guillotine during the French Revolution
French male writers